München Isartalbahnhof is a former railway station on the Isartalbahn in the Munich borough of Thalkirchen. It is now used by the Johanniter service as a rescue station.

Isarat